Aqua omnium florum or all-flower water  was water distilled from cow-dung in May, when the cows ate fresh grass with meadow flowers.  It was also known less euphemistically as aqua stercoris vaccini stillatitia (distilled water of cow dung). This was used as a medicine to treat a variety of ailments including gout, rheumatism and tuberculosis.

The 17th century court physician George Bate favoured it and it appeared in the Pharmacopœia Bateana — Bate's Dispensatory.  Recipes included:

The latter prescription was used as a panacea by a female doctor in Bate's time.  Many incurable cases were brought to her which she treated in this way and she made a great fortune of £20,000 from this practice.

Urina vaccina
Cow tea or urina vaccina (cow's urine) was sometimes called aqua omnium florum too.  This was used as a purgative for which the dosage would be "half a pint drank warm from the cow".  It was drunk by women in May to clear their complexion.

Indian traditional medicine

Cow dung, urine and other bovine products are still used extensively in the traditional Hindu medicine, Ayurveda.

See also
 Compost tea
Beef tea
Mycobacterium vaccae
Stool transplant

References

Cattle
Traditional medicine